Live at the House of Tribes is an album by Wynton Marsalis that was released in 2005.  The performance was recorded in December, 2002 in front of fifty people at a small community theater space in New York's East Village.

Reception
Allmusic's Matt Collar rated the album four stars and stated, "Loose, swinging, funky, and spirited, Live at the House of Tribes is an absolute joy."  Jazz critic Ben Ratliff of the New York Times says of the album, "Throughout the record, the playing almost never goes outside of tonality, and the rhythm section holds fast to swing. But swing brings out the best in these players; the music is fully alive and afire with ideas. It makes you want to have been there."  The Penguin Guide to Jazz Recordings describes the album as “a near-perfect live record, packed with atmosphere and marked by some powerful, wise playing”.

Track listing
 "Green Chimneys" (Thelonious Monk) – 15:49
 "Just Friends" (Klenner, Sam M. Lewis) – 17:48
 "You Don't Know What Love Is" (Gene de Paul, Don Raye) – 12:13
 "Donna Lee" (Miles Davis) – 6:47
 "What Is This Thing Called Love?" (Cole Porter) – 10:27
 "Second Line" (Paul Barbarin) – 3:55

Personnel

Musicians
 Wynton Marsalis – trumpet
 Wessell Anderson – alto saxophone
 Eric Lewis – piano
 Kengo Nakamura – double bass
 Joe Farnsworth – drums
 Robert M. Rucker – tambourine (track 6)
 Orlando Rodriquez – percussion (tracks 1,2,5,6)

Production
 Delfeayo Marsalis – producer
 Patrick L. Smith – mixer
 Stanley Crouch – liner notes

References

Wynton Marsalis albums
Live post-bop albums
Live mainstream jazz albums
2005 live albums
Blue Note Records live albums